Thomas Turner (7 March 1865 – 27 October 1936) was an Australian cricketer. He played five first-class cricket matches for Victoria and South Australia in the 1880s.

References

External links
 

1865 births
1936 deaths
Australian cricketers
Victoria cricketers
People from Nuriootpa, South Australia
Cricketers from South Australia